The year 607 BC was a year of the pre-Julian Roman calendar. In the Roman Empire, it was known as year 147 Ab urbe condita. The denomination 607 BC for this year has been used since the early medieval period, when the Anno Domini calendar era became the prevalent method in Europe for naming years.

Events
Halley's Comet was visible from March 15 through March 26 and passed within 13.5 million kilometers from Earth.

Births
Sudharmaswami, fifth ganadhara of Mahavira (died 507 BC)

Deaths
King Kuang of Zhou, king of the Zhou Dynasty of China
Duke Ling of Jin, ruler of the Chinese state of Jin

References